Datt/Dutt is a Mohyal Brahmin (Saraswat Brahmin) clan from the Punjab.

A faction of this community, called Hussaini Brahmin, has a legend claiming that their ancestors fought for Imam Hussain in the Battle of Karbala.

See also
Chitpavan
Tyagi

References 

Mohyal clans
Indian surnames
Hindu surnames
Punjabi-language surnames
Punjabi tribes